African striped squirrels (genus  Funisciurus), or rope squirrels, form a taxon of squirrels under the subfamily Xerinae and the tribe Protoxerini. They are only found in western and central Africa.

There are nine species in the genus:

 Thomas's rope squirrel (Funisciurus anerythrus) 
 Lunda rope squirrel (Funisciurus bayonii)
 Carruther's mountain squirrel (Funisciurus carruthersi)
 Congo rope squirrel (Funisciurus congicus)
 Lady Burton's rope squirrel (Funisciurus isabella)
 Ribboned rope squirrel (Funisciurus lemniscatus)
 Red-cheeked rope squirrel (Funisciurus leucogenys)
 Fire-footed rope squirrel (Funisciurus pyrropus)
 Kintampo rope squirrel (Funisciurus substriatus)

Zoonoses
African striped squirrels have been implicated in the spread of human monkeypox in the Democratic Republic of the Congo.
African striped squirrels were found to be a source of monkeypox in a 2003 Midwestern monkeypox outbreak.

References 

  
 

 

Rodent genera